The COVID-19 pandemic in the Federated States of Micronesia is part of the ongoing worldwide pandemic of coronavirus disease 2019 caused by severe acute respiratory syndrome coronavirus 2. The virus has reached the Federated States of Micronesia on 8 January 2021.

Background 
On 12 January 2020, the World Health Organization (WHO) confirmed that a novel coronavirus was the cause of a respiratory illness in a cluster of people in Wuhan City, Hubei Province, China, which was reported to the WHO on 31 December 2019.

The case fatality ratio for COVID-19 has been much lower than SARS of 2003, but the transmission has been significantly greater, with a significant total death toll.

Timeline

February 2020
By 3 February 2020, David W. Panuelo, President of the Federated States of Micronesia, had signed a declaration banning Micronesian citizens from travelling to China and other affected countries.

March 2020
By 5 March 2020, Micronesia had introduced a strict travel ban, banning anyone who had been in China anytime since January 2020 – or had been in any other affected country in the last 14 days – from entering Micronesia. As of 18 March, all schools in the country have also been closed.

January 2021
On 8 January 2021, Micronesia reported its first case, that of a crew member on board the MV Chief Mailo near Pohnpei, in managed isolation.

By the end of the month, the case was deemed to be negative and historical after subsequent antibody and antigen tests. The case was deemed a non-infectious "historical case", meaning the individual concerned likely had COVID-19 in the past possibly prior to October 2020 and was asymptomatic at the time of testing.

Statistics

New cases per day

Impact 
Due to the COVID-19 pandemic the Chuuk Women's Council switched from group-based services to one-to-one outreach. A particular concern was access to sexual health resources, including information, as well as HIV prevention packages.

See also
 COVID-19 pandemic in Oceania

Notes

References

Federated States of Micronesia
COVID-19 pandemic in the Federated States of Micronesia
2020 in the Federated States of Micronesia
2021 in the Federated States of Micronesia
COVID-19 pandemic in Oceania